Tachychlora is a genus of moths in the family Geometridae. The genus was erected by Louis Beethoven Prout in 1912.

Species
Some species of this genus are:
Tachychlora amilletes Prout, 1932
Tachychlora baeogonia Prout, 1932
Tachychlora clita Prout, 1932
Tachychlora explicata Prout, 1932
Tachychlora flavicoma (Warren, 1906)
Tachychlora flavidisca (Warren, 1904)
Tachychlora flora E. D. Jones, 1921
Tachychlora insignis
Tachychlora intrapunctata Prout, 1932
Tachychlora lepidaria (Möschler, 1882)
Tachychlora phaeozona Prout, 1932
Tachychlora prasia Prout, 1916
Tachychlora pretiosa
Tachychlora silena Schaus, 1901
Tachychlora subscripta (Warren, 1897)
Tachychlora uricha (Kaye, 1901)

References

Geometrinae